The fifteenth and final season of Supernatural, an American dark fantasy television series created by Eric Kripke, premiered on The CW on October 10, 2019. The series was initially set to conclude in May 2020, but a hiatus occurred after the March 23, 2020 episode owing to production delays caused by the COVID-19 pandemic in the United States. The season resumed airing on October 8, 2020, and the series finale aired on November 19, 2020. The season consisted of 20 episodes and aired on Thursdays at 8:00 pm (ET), with the exception of two March 2020 episodes aired Mondays at 8:00 pm. This was the fourth season with Andrew Dabb and Robert Singer as showrunners. The season follows Sam, Dean and Castiel's battle against God who has been manipulating events in their lives including their family, friends and allies. Angered by their decision to fight him, God jumpstarts the end of everything in creation.

Cast

Starring
 Jared Padalecki as Sam Winchester
 Jensen Ackles as Dean Winchester
 Alexander Calvert as Jack Kline and Belphegor
 Misha Collins as Castiel

Special guest stars
 Jim Beaver as Bobby Singer 
 DJ Qualls as Garth Fitzgerald IV
 Mark Pellegrino as Lucifer

Guest stars

Episodes

Production
On January 31, 2019, The CW renewed the series for a fifteenth season. On March 22, series stars Jared Padalecki, Jensen Ackles, and Misha Collins announced that the 20-episode fifteenth season of Supernatural would also be its last, making it the longest-running series on The CW. Ackles, who last directed the episode "The Bad Seed" from the eleventh season, directed the first episode filmed for the season, which aired chronologically as the fourth episode. Other cast members directing episodes for the season include returning director Richard Speight Jr. and young John Winchester actor Matt Cohen. Jake Abel reprises his role as the Winchesters' long-lost half-brother Adam Milligan, who last appeared in the fifth-season finale.

The series finale was originally set to air on May 18, 2020; however, in March 2020, Warner Bros. Television shut down production on the series due to the COVID-19 pandemic. Later in March, showrunner Andrew Dabb revealed that the season would go on hiatus after the March 23 episode. Dabb clarified that the series had completed production on 18 of the 20 episodes for the season, but the post-production process could not be completed on the episodes because of the shutdown due to the virus outbreak. Dabb also assured  that the series' cast and crew, The CW, and Warner Bros. were fully committed to filming and airing the unproduced episodes with its proper finale. In August 2020, The CW announced that the season would resume airing on October 8, 2020, and series finale aired on November 19, which was preceded by a special titled The Long Road Home. Filming resumed on August 18, and concluded on September 10, 2020.

Reception

Critical reception

Based on 12 reviews, the review aggregator website Rotten Tomatoes reports a 100% approval rating for Supernaturals fifteenth season with an average rating of 8.9/10.

Ratings

Notes

References

External links
 
 

Supernatural 15
2019 American television seasons
2020 American television seasons
Television productions suspended due to the COVID-19 pandemic
Fiction about deicide